Sherman Augustus (born January 10, 1959) is an American actor, martial artist and former NFL player. He is best known for his role as Nathaniel Moon in the AMC series Into the Badlands and as Lt. Colonel Sullivan in season 4 of Stranger Things. Augustus played professional football with the San Diego Chargers and Minnesota Vikings. He played college football at Northwestern College in Saint Paul, Minnesota with Jimmy Bridges.

He is a 2nd Degree Black Belt in the martial art of Taekwondo.

Filmography

Film

Television

References

External links

1959 births
Players of American football from Minnesota
American male film actors
American male television actors
American male taekwondo practitioners
American male soap opera actors
African-American male actors
San Diego Chargers players
Minnesota Vikings players
Living people
Place of birth missing (living people)